Muthurayana Hosahalli Kaval is a small village in Mysore district of Karnataka state, India.

Location
Muthurayana Hosahalli Kaval is located on the Mysore—Virajpet road, 10 km from Hunsur.

Demographics
According to 2011 census, this village has a total population of 1,558 people.  There are 349 houses in the village.

Villages and Suburbs
 Hulaganahalli
 Vadlimanuganahalli
 Kallahallikaval
 Angatahalli
 Ramenahalli
 Chennasoge
 Hosakote

Festivals
Yugadi, Dussehra, Makar Sankranti, Karaga, Hampi Utsava (festival), Hoysala Mahotsava (celebration), Vairamudi, Tula Sankramana, Diwali, Eid-ul-Adha, Muharram, Eid-ul-Fitr are the major festivals celebrated in Muthurayana Hosahalli.

Economy
Rice, ragi, jowar, maize, pulses, oilseeds, cashews, coconut, arecanut, cardamom, chillies, cotton, sugarcane and tobacco are the major crops that are cultivated mostly in the area.

References

Villages in Mysore district